"Hands Up" is a 1995 song by Norwegian Eurodance group , consisting of singer Linda Johansen and two rappers. It is a cover of the 1981-single by the French pop music duo Ottawan and peaked at number 10 in Norway. In Finland, it was a even bigger hit, reaching number 7. A controversial music video featuring frequent nudity with brief modesty bars was also made for the song. Swedish band Army of Lovers had a number 44 hit in Sweden in 2001 with their cover version.

Track listing

Charts

References

 

1995 singles
1995 songs
Norwegian dance songs
Eurodance songs
Songs written by Nelly Byl
Songs written by Jean Kluger
Songs written by Daniel Vangarde